Kapteel Bridge (Zomi: Kapteel Guun Lei) is a bridge in Tedim Township, Chin State, Myanmar and opened on April 25, 2002. Kapteel Bridge is a suspension bridge across Manipur River in Chin State (Zogam).

The bridge is on Tedim - Kapteel - Rih Lake motor road. The bridge was built by Deputy Superintending Engineer U San Win.

Opening ceremony
The bridge opening ceremony was held at the central pandal of the bridge on April 25, 2002. The opening ceremony was attended by Chairman of Sagaing Division Peace and Development Council Commander of North-West Command Brig-Gen Soe Naing, Minister for Construction Maj-Gen Saw Tun, Brig-Gen Khin Maung Aye of Kalay Station, Deputy Minister for Construction Brig-Gen Myint Thein, officials of the ministry, state/district/township level departmental officials, members of the Union Solidarity and Development Association, Maternal and Child Welfare Association, Red Cross Society and Social Organization, and local people, totalling 2,200.

References

Buildings and structures in Chin State
Bridges in Myanmar
Bridges completed in 2002
2002 establishments in Myanmar